The Vought/General Dynamics Model 1600 series was a fighter aircraft proposal designed for the United States Navy's Navy Air Combat Fighter (NACF) program. The Model 1600 was a carrier-based derivative of the General Dynamics F-16 Fighting Falcon, but lost to the Northrop/McDonnell Douglas F/A-18 Hornet.

Development

Following the YF-16's victory over the Northrop YF-17 for the U.S. Air Force's ACF competition, General Dynamics decided a navalized variant could also best it in the Navy's Navy Air Combat Fighter (NACF) program. Having no carrier aircraft experience, GD teamed up with Vought (LTV Aerospace), which had designed the successful carrier-capable F-8 Crusader and A-7 Corsair II for the Navy; if selected, Vought would have produced the carrier version of the F-16.

LTV created three concepts for the navalized F-16. The main proposal was the Model 1600, which was based on the Block 10 F-16. It featured structural strengthening, an arrestor hook, and a more robust undercarriage to accommodate the rigors of carrier launch and recovery operations. The Model 1600 employed the Pratt & Whitney F401, but two other powerplant choices were also explored. The Model 1601 had an improved Pratt & Whitney F100, while the Model 1602 used the General Electric F101. The aircraft was to be armed with AIM-7 Sparrow air-air missiles.  Launch rails were to be added on the sides of the intakes for AIM-9 Sidewinder missiles. However, the Navy preferred a twin-engine aircraft, among other reasons, and on 2 May 1975 it selected the Northrop-McDonnell Douglas YF-17-based Model 267 proposal, which became the F/A-18 Hornet.

Variants
Model 1600  A strengthened version of the F-16 Block 10 with carrier arrestor hook and revised nosewheel. It was powered by the Pratt & Whitney F401 (JTF22A-26C) afterburning turbofan.
Model 1601  Similar to Model 1600, except equipped with an upgraded Pratt & Whitney F100 (JTF22B-25) afterburning turbofan.
Model 1602  Similar to Model 1601, except with a General Electric F101-100 engine, a further enlarged fuselage, and avionics and armament changes.
Model 1602B  Final submission in March 1975; least like the F-16.

Specifications (Model 1600)

See also

References

Notes

Bibliography
 
 Peacock, Lindsay. On Falcon Wings: The F-16 Story.  RAF Fairford, United Kingdom: The Royal Air Force Benevolent Fund Enterprises, 1997. .
 Senior, Tim. The AirForces Monthly Book of the F-16 Fighting Falcon. Stamford, UK: Key Books Ltd, 2002. .

External links
 F-16 page on GlobalSecurity.org

1600
Cancelled military aircraft projects of the United States
Single-engined jet aircraft
Carrier-based aircraft
General Dynamics F-16 Fighting Falcon
Mid-wing aircraft